The following is a list of county roads in Collier County, Florida.  All county roads are maintained by the county in which they reside, however not all of them are marked with standard MUTCD approved county road shields.

Most of county roads in Collier County were formerly state roads.  In the mid 1970s, the Florida Department of Transportation (formerly the State Road Department) downgraded a number of the state roads to secondary state roads.  On January 5, 1976, many of the roads were also renumbered to have a more streamlined numbering system.  By the mid 1980s, the secondary state roads were turned over to county control.

County Road 29

County Road 29, once part of State Road 29 prior to the 1980s, is a 13-mile route connecting Everglades City and Chokoloskee Island with the Tamiami Trail in Carnestown.

The southern terminus of CR 29 is in Chokoloskee, where it known as Smallwood Avenue (named for Ted Smallwood, who opened the areas historic general store which is now a museum).  From Chokoloksee, CR 29 crosses a causeway across Chokoloskee Bay, which was built in 1956, to Everglades City.

In Everglades City, CR 29 is known as Copeland Avenue in the southern half of the town.  Copeland Avenue is named for David Graham Copeland, who worked closely with Barron Collier in the development of Everglades City.

Just north of Everglades Airpark, CR 29 encounters a roundabout, where it turns east along Broadway towards the former Atlantic Coast Line Railroad depot.  It then turns north along Collier Avenue, where it continues out of the city and terminating at U.S. Route 41 in Carnestown.

County Road 29A

County Road 29A is New Market Road in Immokalee.  The 2.3 mile route connects to State Road 29 at each end, and it serves as a bypass around downtown Immokalee.

County Road 31

County Road 31 is one of the Naples area's major north–south corridors. It is known as Airport-Pulling Road, which runs from US 41 in East Naples to CR 846 (Immokalee Road) in North Naples.  Originally known as Airport Road due to its proximity to Naples Municipal Airport, the name was amended to honor John Pulling, Sr. who was one of Collier County's major land investors.

Prior to the 1976 renumbering, the current CR 31 was known as State Road 31 north of the current Golden Gate Parkway.  Between Golden Gate Parkway and Radio Road, it was part of SR 951, and SR 858 from Radio Road south.  In the mid 1970s, many of the areas designations were changed, and the current Airport-Pulling Road became SR 31 in its entirety.  SR 31 also extended south past US 41 along Bayshore Drive.  The route was relinquished to county control in the 1980s.

When CR 31 was part of State Road 31, it was a discontinuous route, for there was (and still is) a State Road 31 just to the north running from Fort Myers Shores to Arcadia.

Major intersections

County Road 92

County Road 92 is known as San Marco Road.  It runs from Collier Boulevard (former State Road 951) on Marco Island east to Goodland.  At Goodland, CR 92 crosses the Goodland Bridge onto the mainland, and continues northeast to its terminus at U.S. Route 41 near Collier-Seminole State Park.

Formerly State Road 92, the road was complete in 1938 with the opening of the original Goodland Bridge, which was the first automobile bridge to Marco Island.  The original bridge was a wooden swing bridge.  Remnants of the old bridge still exist next to the current bridge which opened in 1975.

County Road 837

County Road 837 exists in two segments near Copeland.  The west segment is less than a half mile long running from State Road 29 into Copeland.  The longer east segment, known as Wagon Wheel Road, exists just north of Copeland running from SR 29 east to CR 839 in the Big Cypress National Preserve.

County Road 839

County Road 839, locally known as Turner River Road, is a 20-mile route through the Big Cypress National Preserve.  It runs just east of and parallel to State Road 29.  It begins at U.S. Route 41 east of Ochopee near the Turner River and ends just east of Miles City after crossing underneath I-75/Alligator Alley.

County Road 841

County Road 841 is a short 4.4 mile road through the Big Cypress National Preserve.  It is named Birdon Road, and it connects U.S. Route 41 in Ochopee to CR 837 east of Copeland.

County Road 846

County Road 846 runs over 40 miles through northern Collier County primarily connecting Naples with Immokalee.

It begins in North Naples near Delnor-Wiggins Pass State Park and runs east through North Naples intersecting U.S. Route 41 and Interstate 75.  It turns north near Orangetree and then turns east again, passing Corkscrew Swamp Sanctuary.  Near Ave Maria, it turns north again and enters Immokalee near the Seminole Casino Immokalee.  At State Road 29 in Immokalee, there is a brief gap in the route.  CR 846 resumes near Immokalee Regional Airport and heads east into Hendry County.

Formerly State Road 846 and once known as the Naples-Immokalee Highway, CR 846 is primarily known today as Immokalee Road.  Although, west of US 41 in North Naples, it is 111th Avenue, and it is also known as First Street within Immokalee.

Major intersections

County Road 849

County Road 849 is Sanctuary Road just north of Orangetree.  It connects CR 846 with the entrance to Corkscrew Swamp Sanctuary.  It was formerly State Road 846A before the 1976 renumbering and SR 849 after until it was relinquished to the county.

County Road 850

County Road 850 is Corkscrew Road in northeastern Collier County.  It begins at the Lee-Collier County line east of Immokalee, continuing from the Lee County portion which begins in Estero.  It terminates at State Road 82 near Immokalee.

County Road 851

County Road 851 is one of Collier County's north–south corridors known locally as Goodlette-Frank Road.  It runs just east of U.S. Route 41 from CR 846 (Immokalee Road) south to US 41 in downtown Naples, passing near Coastland Center and the Naples Zoo.  The road is named for former Collier County Commissioner Richard Goodlette, and Ed Frank, a business man who started the area's iconic swamp buggy races.

Goodlette-Frank Road runs along a route that historically served as the Naples area's railroad corridor.  The railroad existed from 1927 to 1979.  The removal of the tracks allowed for the widening of Goodlette-Frank Road, with the current southbound lanes located where the tracks were.  It was extended north from CR 896 (Pine Ridge Road) to Immokalee Road in the early 1990s.

Goodlette-Frank Road was designated State Road 851 in 1976.  Prior to the renumbering, it was part of SR 951 north of present-day CR 886 (Golden Gate Parkway).  South of there, it was SR 951A.  It was relinquished to county control in the mid 1980s.

Major intersections

County Road 856

County Road 856 is  Radio Road from CR 31 to State Road 84 in Naples.  It was formerly SR 856, and prior to the 1976 renumbering, it was part of SR 858.  Radio Road is named for Naples first radio station WNOG, whose transmission tower was located along the road.

County Road 858

County Road 858 extends east from CR 846 in Orangetree and runs just south of Ave Maria and Immokalee before turning north and running along the Hendry County Line.  The east–west segment is known as Oil Well Road  and the north–south segment is County Line Road.

The route was formerly State Road 858.  Although prior to the 1976 renumbering, Oil Well Road was SR 840 east of SR 29 and County Line Road was SR 840A.  At that time, the SR 858 designation continued into southern Naples.  From the current western terminus, it zig zagged along the current routes of Immokalee Road, Collier Boulevard, Radio Road, Airport Pulling Road and Bayshore Drive.

County Road 862

County Road 862 is Vanderbilt Beach Road, an east–west route through northern Collier County.  It runs from Vanderbilt Beach to eastern Collier County.  It was formerly State Road 862 west of US 41.

County Road 864 

County Road 864 is an east–west route through East Naples.  Begins at Bayshore Drive, it is known as Thomasson Drive and runs east to US 41.  At US 41, it becomes Rattlesnake Hammock Road and continues east to CR 951.

County Road 881

County Road 881 is Livingston Road, a major north–south corridor between U.S. Route 41 and Interstate 75.  It begins at Radio Road and continues north into Lee County where is continues as Imperial Parkway and Three Oaks Parkway.  Most of Livingston Road was built in the early to mid 2000s to be a third corridor into Lee County.

Major intersections

County Road 886

County Road 886 is one of the main east–west corridors connecting Naples with Golden Gate Estates.  Locally known as Golden Gate Parkway, it begins at US 41 in Naples and heads east passing Coastland Center and Naples High School.  It has interchanges with CR 31 (Airport Pulling Road) and Interstate 75 as it continues east into Golden Gate Estates, and terminates at CR 951.

The initial segment of Golden Gate Parkway was between present day Goodlette-Frank and Airport-Pulling Roads, which was part of State Road 951 prior to the renumbering in 1976.   It then became State Road 886 around the time it was extended to present day Collier Boulevard (which took over the SR 951 designation after the renumbering).

Golden Gate Parkway was upgraded significantly in the mid 2000s.  It was widened to six lanes with the addition of the overpass at CR 31 (Airport-Pulling Road).  Interchange ramps were also added at Interstate 75 around that time (Golden Gate Parkway previously crossed the interstate without an interchange).

Major intersections

County Road 887

County Road 887 is part of the original alignment of US 41 known today as Old 41 Road.  It branches off of US 41 in North Naples, running north into Lee County.

The road was originally a routing of Tamiami Trail (US 41) through Downtown Bonita Springs.  It became SR 887 when US 41 was moved to its present alignment in 1976.  The SR 887 designation has been reused for the Port Miami Tunnel since its opening on August 3, 2014.

County Road 888

County Road 888 is Wiggins Pass Road in North Naples.  It runs from County Road 901 (Vanderbilt Drive) near Delnor-Wiggins State Park east crossing U.S. Route 41 and terminating just east of US 41 at a Cemex plant.  West of US 41, it was once State Road 888, and it was State Road 865B prior to the renumbering in 1976.

County Road 890

County Road 890 connects downtown Immokalee with Lake Trafford to the west.  It is locally known as Lake Trafford Road.

County Road 892 

County Road 892 is a short mile-long route on Marco Island connecting CR 92 (San Marco Road) with the community of Goodland.  It is locally named Goodland Drive.

County Road 894

County Road 894 is a short road just north of downtown Immokalee.  It is known locally as Experimental Station Road.  It runs half a mile east from State Road 29.

County Road 896

County Road 896 runs from U.S. Route 41 east along the northern city limit of Naples.  It is known locally as Pine Ridge Road and serves as one of the northern part of town's access to Interstate 75.  From Interstate 75, it continues east to CR 951.

Pine Ridge Road was originally a spur of State Road 31, connecting it to US 41.   After the renumbering in 1976, it was redesignated SR 896, and has since been extended.

Major intersections

County Road 898

County Road 898 is Solana Road between U.S. Route 41 and CR 851 (Goodlette-Frank Road).

County Road 901 

County Road 901, known as Vanderbilt Drive, runs along the coast of Northern Collier County.  It begins at CR 862 (Vanderbilt Beach Road) and runs north, terminating just at the Lee-Collier County Line at Bonita Beach Road (Lee County Road 865) in Bonita Springs.  It was formerly State Road 901, and was State Road 865A prior to the 1976 renumbering.

County Road 951

County Road 951 is the main north–south route through East Naples and Golden Gate.  It begins at U.S. Route 41 in East Naples.  Heading north, it intersects State Road 84 and Interstate 75 before running along the eastern side of Golden Gate.  It terminates at CR 846 (Immokalee Road).  Known as Collier Bouevard, CR 951 was once part of State Road 951.  Prior to the 1976 renumbering, it was part of State Road 858 north of State Road 84.

County Road 952

County Road 952 is the main access to the Isles of Capri near Marco Island.  Known as Capri Boulevard, it begins at the Isles of Capri at Pelican Street and runs north and east, ending at SR 951.  Formerly State Road 952, it was part of State Road 951 before the renumbering in 1976 (it was a continuous route with SR 951 prior to the construction of the S.S. Jolley Bridge in 1969.)

County Road 953

County Road 953 is Bald Eagle Drive on Marco Island.  It begins at CR 92 (San Marco Road) in the middle of the island and runs north, terminating at Palm Street near the Snook Inn.

References

FDOT Map of Collier County
FDOT GIS data, accessed January 2014

 
County